Peter William Scott (born 19 September 1952 in Liverpool, England) is an English-born Northern Irish former footballer. He represented England at Youth level and Northern Ireland at full international level, making a total of 10 appearances for the team.

Career
Scott served his apprenticeship with Everton and signed full-time professional terms with the club in July 1970. He made his First Division debut in the 1971–72 season. He joined Southport on loan in January 1974 and made four league appearances for the club. He joined York City for a fee in the region of £11,000 in December 1975, after making 44 appearances and scoring one goal in the league for Everton. He made a total of 114 appearances and scored three goals for the club, and was their most capped player after making seven appearances for Northern Ireland whilst with them. He joined Aldershot in March 1979 for a fee of £3,000, for whom he made 121 appearances and scored two goals in the league. He made a total of 10 appearances for Northern Ireland, but was also an England Youth international.

Notes

External links

Peter Scott on NIFG

1952 births
Living people
Footballers from Liverpool
English footballers
England youth international footballers
Association footballers from Northern Ireland
Northern Ireland international footballers
Association football defenders
Everton F.C. players
Southport F.C. players
York City F.C. players
Aldershot F.C. players
English Football League players